USS Johnston (DD-557) was a  built for the United States Navy during World War II. She was named after Lieutenant John V. Johnston, an officer of the US Navy during the American Civil War. Johnston was laid down in May 1942 and was launched on 25 March 1943. She entered active duty in October 1943 under the command of Lieutenant Commander Ernest E. Evans and was assigned to the US Pacific Fleet. Johnston provided naval gunfire support for American ground forces during the Gilbert and Marshall Islands campaign in January and February 1944 and again, after three months of patrol and escort duty in the Solomon Islands, during the recapture of Guam in July. Thereafter, Johnston was tasked with escorting escort carriers during the Mariana and Palau Islands campaign and the liberation of the Philippines.

On 25 October 1944, while assigned as part of the escort to six escort carriers, Johnston, two other Fletcher-class destroyers, and four destroyer escorts were engaged by a large Imperial Japanese Navy flotilla. In what became known as the Battle off Samar, Johnston and the other escort ships charged the Japanese ships to protect nearby US carriers and transport craft. After engaging several Japanese capital ships and a destroyer squadron, Johnston was sunk with 187 dead, including Evans. Johnstons wreck was discovered on 30 October 2019 but was not properly identified until March 2021.

Design and characteristics
To rectify the top-heaviness and stability problems of the preceding  and es, the Fletcher class was greatly increased in size over the older designs. This allowed them to accept additional anti-aircraft (AA) guns and electronic equipment as well as their operators without sacrificing guns or torpedoes as the older ships were forced to do during the war.

In early 1942, the design of the Fletchers was modified to reduce topweight and to simplify the construction of the bridge by squaring off the curves at its front. The splinter plating protecting the bridge and the director was also reduced in thickness. In addition, visibility from the bridge was improved by the addition of an open platform connected to the bridge wings. 

The ships were powered by two General Electric geared steam turbines that each drove one propeller shaft using steam provided by four Babcock & Wilcox boilers. They were crewed by 9 officers and 264 enlisted men.

Armament, fire control, protection and sensors
The main battery of the Fletcher-class destroyers consisted of five dual-purpose /38 caliber guns in single mounts which were grouped in superfiring pairs fore and after of the superstructure. The fifth mount was positioned on the aft superstructure forward of the aft pair. The guns were controlled by the Mark 37 director. Their anti-aircraft battery depended on the availability of the weapons, but Johnston was built with ten  Bofors guns in five powered twin-gun mounts and seven manually operated  Oerlikon cannons. The forward pair of Bofors mounts were located forward of the bridge and the second pair were on platforms abreast the aft funnel with one mount on each broadside; the last mount was positioned between the aft superfiring pair of guns and the single mounts forward of them. Each mount was controlled by a nearby Mark 51 director. Four Oerlikons were located amidships, two on each broadside, and three were grouped in a triangle at the stern, next to the depth charge racks.

The ships were fitted with two racks, each holding eight  depth charges and adjacent to them were two storage racks with five depth charges each. Abreast the aft superstructure were six "K-gun" throwers, three on each side, with five  depth charges. The destroyers were equipped with two quintuple rotating  torpedo tube mounts for Mark 15 torpedoes.

The Fletchers had only minimal armor that was intended to protect against shell splinters and fragments. The sides of the propulsion machinery compartments consisted of plates  of special treatment steel (STS) while the deck above them consisted of  STS. Furthermore, the protective plating of the Mark 37 director was reduced from the earlier 0.75 inches to 0.5 inches.

The Fletcher-class destroyers were equipped with a Mark 4 or Mark 12 fire-control radar on the roof of the Mark 37 director. A SC-2 early-warning radar and a SG surface-search radar were fitted on the foremast. For anti-submarine work, the ships used a QC series sonar.

Construction and service history
Construction of Johnston, named after Lieutenant John V. Johnston, an officer of the US Navy during the American Civil War, began with the laying of her keel at the Seattle-Tacoma Shipbuilding Corporation's yard on 6 May 1942. Her launch, sponsored by Marie S. Klinger, Lt. Johnston's grandniece, took place on 25 March 1943. Johnston was finally commissioned into the United States Navy and placed under the command of Lieutenant Commander Ernest E. Evans on 27 October 1943. She then sailed to the Puget Sound Naval Shipyard and fitted out into early November. On 15 November, Johnston sailed for San Diego, California. From 19 November to 1 January 1944, Johnston put out to sea for her shakedown cruise and her crew trained with fleet units near San Diego.

Gilbert and Marshall Islands campaign

On 13 January 1944 Johnston set sail for Hawaii with a US Navy squadron led by Rear Admiral Jesse B. Oldendorf and arrived 21 January. From there, Johnston sailed to join the ongoing campaign against the Japanese Empire in the Gilbert and Marshall Islands. She arrived by 29 January and was assigned to Fire Support Group 53.5 under Oldendorf. Johnston sailed for the Kwajalein Atoll, where from 31 January to 3 February she provided gunfire support for American forces attacking Roi-Namur Island.

The convoy set sail on 6 February but en route Johnston was ordered to return to the Marshalls for resupply. She arrived on 8 February, refueled, and then set sail for Kwajalein on 10 February. Her arrival was delayed until the next day after jellyfish clogged and overheated her condensers.

Almost as soon Johnston arrived, she was tasked with investigating a sighting of a Japanese submarine. No such vessel was detected. Early on 12 February, Japanese bombers attacked Roi-Namur, inflicting heavy casualties to the occupying Americans. In response to their detection on radar, Johnston and the other present American ships laid smoke to obscure their positions. They were not attacked. Johnston was then attached to Operation Catchpole, the American attack on Enewetak Atoll. Then, from 19 February to 25 February, Johnston provided gunfire support for American troops herself and patrolled for submarines.

Solomon Islands campaign

The trio was ordered back to the Marshall Islands on 28 February and arrived on 1 March. Johnston resupplied over the next five days. Johnston docked in the auxiliary floating drydock  for minor repairs from 18 to 19 March, then set out for the Solomon Islands on 20 March. She arrived at Purvis Bay, near Guadalcanal, the following day and was subsequently assigned to patrol duties around New Ireland. Upon their return to the Solomons on 29 March, the destroyers were assigned additional patrol duties. For the rest of March and all of April, they patrolled the northern Solomons, escorted Allied shipping to and from them, and occasionally provided gunfire support for the US Army's XIV Corps on Bougainville Island.

Johnston began May 1944 moored in Purvis Bay undergoing minor repairs. The destroyers immediately began searching for the vessel and, late on 16 May, discovered it. Haggard, then Johnston, and then Franks attacked the submarine with depth charges and sank it after midnight on 17 May. Johnston thereafter resumed patrol and escort duty, then docked with the destroyer tender  for minor repairs from 27 May to 2 June.

Mariana and Palau Islands campaign

On 3 June 1944, Johnston joined a convoy of US warships headed to Kwajalein to join a fleet gathering to recapture Guam. The convoy arrived on 8 June, then made for Guam four days later with the invasion force and arrived by 18 June. The ongoing Battle of Saipan, however, delayed the invasion. On 30 June, the fleet was ordered to return to Kwajalein; Johnston arrived on 3 July and returned to patrol duty. When the invasion force was ordered back to Guam on 14 July, Johnston again sailed as part of its screen. The fleet arrived four days later. From 21 July to 1 August, Johnston joined several battleships, cruisers, and destroyers to furnish gunfire support for the 1st Marine Brigade and the 77th Infantry Division. Afterwards, from 2 August to 9 August, she screened for American ships.

The flotilla arrived on 12 August, resupplied, and then sailed for Espiritu Santo from 19 August to 24 August. Three days later, after undergoing minor repairs, Johnston set sail for Purvis Bay with Pennsylvania, Louisville, Minneapolis, and seven other destroyers. Johnston and her charges received orders on 21 September to proceed to Ulithi, an atoll in the Caroline Islands, where they arrived on 23 September.

Battle off Samar

The flotilla departed Ulithi on 25 September 1944 and arrived in Seeadler Harbor, in the Admiralty Islands on 1 October 1944. There, on 12 October, Johnston was assigned to the US 7th Fleet, which was preparing to invade the Philippines. These ships formed TU 77.4.3 (call sign "Taffy 3"), a sub-unit of the 7th Fleet's Escort Carrier Group (TG 77.4) commanded by Rear Admiral Clifton Sprague, aboard Fanshaw Bay, and sailed into Leyte Gulf on 17 October. In response, on 18 October, the Imperial Japanese Navy dispatched three fleets to cut off and destroy the American ground forces. The largest fleet was placed under the command of Vice Admiral Takeo Kurita and took a path that, on 25 October, led it to TG 77.4.

Though Kurita's fleet – by 25 October numbering four battleships, eight cruisers, and 11 destroyers – had been attacked by US submarines and aircraft over the previous two days, TG 77.4 was not made aware of the Japanese force until Taffy 3's surface radar detected it at 0646.

At 0657, Sprague ordered Taffy 3 to head east at top speed and lay smoke. Finding Johnston at the rear of the formation, however, Commander Evans ordered a turn to the northeast so that Johnston could charge the Japanese for a torpedo attack and lay smoke to cover the flotilla's escape. At 0710, Johnston began firing on the heavy cruiser , leading a column of cruisers, as she sailed into the  range of Johnstons 5 in main battery. Johnston fired more than 200 main battery shells at the Kumano over the next five minutes, striking the cruiser at least 40 times and setting her superstructure on fire.

At least one of Johnstons torpedoes struck Kumano, blowing the bow off the latter. This damage forced Kumano and the cruiser , which pulled alongside Kumano, to retire from the battle. At 0730, Johnston sustained three 14 in and three 6 in shell hits. Hidden in her smoke and a rain squall for the next ten minutes, Johnstons crew restored power to two of the aft main guns. The third was permanently disconnected from fire control and had to be operated manually.

After turning south to rejoin Taffy 3, Johnston encountered Hoel, Heermann, and Samuel B. Roberts, en route to make their own torpedo attacks. Evans turned Johnston around to follow and support them, in the process exchanging gunfire with the heavy cruiser . By 0820, the escorts had launched their torpedoes and turned south, making smoke and still exchanging fire with the Japanese, to rejoin Taffy 3. This was accomplished by 0840, when Heermann and Johnston, enveloped in smoke, nearly collided. At that time, Johnston spotted the battleship ,  distant, fired 30 shells at her, and then evaded returned fire from Kongō. Johnston next sighted Gambier Bay, immobile, listing to port, and under fire from a heavy cruiser, and briefly fired on the cruiser. Johnston ceased fire as four Japanese destroyers led by light cruiser  approached the other carriers.

She hit the cruiser 12 times and was in turn struck by several 5 in shells. In response, Yahagi, also being strafed by US aircraft, turned to starboard and disengaged. Johnston turned her fire on the Japanese destroyers, which soon also banked starboard and, with Yahagi, discharged their torpedoes at the carriers without effect. The squadron, joined by two more cruisers, then focused on Johnston, and, in short order, denuded her of her main mast, last engine, and guns, rendered the bridge uninhabitable, and set much of the ship ablaze. Evans moved his command to the fantail, where, at 0945, he ordered the crew to abandon ship. At 1010, Johnston rolled over and sank. Of her complement of 327 men, 186 men and officers, including Evans, died. The remaining 141 men were rescued by American vessels after 50 hours at sea. Johnston was struck from the Navy Register on 27 November 1944.

Awards
Johnston received six battle stars and, for the action at Samar, a Presidential Unit Citation. For the same action, Commander Evans was posthumously awarded the Medal of Honor.

Wreck discovery
On 30 October 2019, the research vessel (RV) , belonging to Vulcan Inc., discovered the remains of what was believed to be Johnston at the bottom of the Philippine Trench. The remains consisted of a deck gun, a propeller shaft, and some miscellaneous debris that could not be used to identify the wreck, but additional debris was observed lying deeper than the RV could go. On 31 March 2021, the research vessel DSV Limiting Factor of Caladan Oceanic, financed and piloted by Victor Vescovo, surveyed and photographed the deeper wreck and definitively identified it as Johnston. Until Samuel B. Roberts was discovered on 22 June 2022, Johnston was the deepest discovered shipwreck in the world.

Notes

Citations

References

Further reading

External links

 

1943 ships
2019 archaeological discoveries
Fletcher-class destroyers of the United States Navy
Maritime incidents in October 1944
Ships built in Seattle
Shipwrecks of the Philippines
World War II destroyers of the United States
World War II shipwrecks in the Philippine Sea